The  Faculty of Management at the Warsaw University of Technology  (pl.:  Wydział Zarządzania Politechniki Warszawskiej , WZ) is a business school in Warsaw. Its facilities are located on the southern side of the Warsaw University of Technology campus on ul. Narbutta 85.

History 

The Faculty of Management was established on 26 March 2008, by resolution of the Senate of Warsaw University of Technology (No. 296/XLVI/2008). The faculty was formed from the structure of the Institute of Organization of Production Systems, which operated within the Faculty of Production Engineering.   Operations of the new college structure began on 1 September 2008. However, the Faculty of Management can trace its origin back to 1922, when Warsaw Tech introduced management education as the first university in Poland, and also one of the first in the world.

Degrees and concentrations

Bachelor's degree

 Management (BA) – with a concentration in:
 Production management
 Technology transfer and innovation management
 Quality management
 Ergonomics and the work environment
 Business management
 Finance and risk management
 Business informatics

 Production Engineering and Management (engineer) – with a concentration in:
 Production management
 Information management systems
 Technology transfer and innovation management

Master's degree (or a Master of Science)

Management (MA) – with a concentration in:
 Enterprise in an integrated Europe
 Production in international markets
 Digital economy

Departments 
 Department of Innovation Management
 Department of Production Management
 Department of Business Informatics
 Department of Finance and Enterprise Management
 Department of Qualitative Research

References

External links 
 Official website of the Department of Management

Warsaw University of Technology
Educational institutions established in 2008
Business schools in Poland
2008 establishments in Poland